The Leptanthuridae are a family of isopod crustaceans, containing the following genera:
Accalathura Barnard, 1925
Aenigmathura Thomson, 1951
Albanthura Wägele, 1985
Bourbonanthura Müller, 1990
Bullowanthura Poore, 1978
Bunderanthura 
Calathura Norman & Stebbing, 1886
Curassanthura Kensley, 1981
Leptanthura Sars, 1897
Negoescuanthura 
Neoanthura 
Psittanthura Wägele, 1985
Ulakanthura Poore, 1978
Virganthura Kensley, 1987

References

Cymothoida
Crustacean families